"Million Miles Away" is the fourth and final single from Kim Wilde's 1992 album Love Is,  released only in continental Europe, Australia and Japan.  The track was remixed from its original album form for its single release.  An extended club mix was also used for the 12" and CD-single formats.

In Australia, "Million Miles Away" was released on 16 November 1992, and peaked at #154 on the ARIA singles chart.

References

Kim Wilde songs
1992 songs
Songs written by Ricky Wilde
Songs written by Kim Wilde